Asset Back Lending (ABL) typically provides collateralized credit facilities to borrowers with high financial leverage and marginal cash flows.

Collateral 
ABL's primary focus is on collateral and liquidity with leverage and cash flow being secondary considerations.  Borrowings under an asset-based facility are limited by the collateral base, which is measured by liquidation value of accounts receivable, inventory and fixed assets rather than by reference to direct, ongoing cash generation capacity.

ABL versus distressed lending
ABL structures can be contrasted with distressed lending which typically provides credit facilities to borrowers with good cash generation capacity but short-term liquidity issues.  Such loans typically take the form of bridge or Mezzanine capital or similar hybrid structures and often place the distressed lender in a better position than existing common shareholders and lenders with respect to company's assets and cashflow.

See also

 Annual percentage rate (a.k.a. Effective annual rate)
 Bank
 Borro Private Finance
 Building society
 Credit risk
 Consumer debt
 Debt
 Debt consolidation
 Default (finance)
 Government debt
 High-yield debt
 Fractional-reserve banking, 
 Finance
 Government debt
 Settlement (finance)
 Interest-only loan
 Loan guarantee
 Loan sale
 Negative amortization
 Payday loan
 Personal finance
 PIK loan
 Private equity
 Refund Anticipation Loan
 Stafford loan
 Student loan
 Student loan default
 Syndicated loan
 Title loan

References

Securities (finance)